Chodkowo-Biernaty  is a village in the administrative district of Gmina Płoniawy-Bramura, within Maków County, Masovian Voivodeship, in east-central Poland.

References

Chodkowo-Biernaty